The Black-banded hogfish (Bodianus macrourus) is a species of wrasse from the genus Bodianus. It is restricted to a small area in the Western Indian Ocean. The only known locations are Mauritius, Réunion and St. Brandon, where it occurs near tropical reefs at a depth of 10-40 meters below surface.

The species reaches a length of 32 cm. Because of the limited range in the wild, it occurs only rarely in the fish trade.

References